The  is a large multi-purpose public cultural facility in the city of Fukushima, Japan, which opened in September 1970.

Facilities
The building includes a main concert hall, which seats 1,752, and a smaller hall, which seats 379.

History
The Fukushima Prefectural Culture Center opened in September 1970.

The building sustained extensive damage in the Great East Japan earthquake on 11 March 2011, and was closed to the public until some parts were able to be reopened for use from 13 August 2011. From 28 December 2011, the entire facility was closed again temporarily for work to repair earthquake damage and reinforce the building. It reopened from 29 September 2012.

Performances
Musical artists and groups that have appeared on stage at the Fukushima Prefectural Culture Center include the following.

 The Alfee, Flying Away Spring, 21 June 1984
 Fuzjko Hemming, Fuzjko Hemming and The Moscow Philharmonic Orchestra, 21 November 2008
 B'z, Live-Gym 2010 "Ain't No Magic", 19 January 2010

Art exhibitions
The Contemporary Art Biennale of Fukushima exhibition was held at the Fukushima Prefectural Culture Center every two years since 2004, but had to be relocated to Fukushima Airport in 2012 because the facility was rendered unusable by the March 2011 earthquake damage.

Access
The Fukushima Prefectural Culture Center is located approximately 10 minutes by car from the main Fukushima Station.

References

External links
  

Concert halls in Japan
Buildings and structures in Fukushima Prefecture
Tourist attractions in Fukushima Prefecture
Fukushima (city)